Húsavíkurvöllur (Icelandic: , regionally also ) is a multi-use stadium in Húsavík, Iceland.  It is currently used mostly for football matches and is the home stadium of Íþróttafélagið Völsungur. Its capacity is around 2000.

References

Football venues in Iceland
Húsavík